Paramacronychiinae is a subfamily of flesh flies (insects in the family Sarcophagidae).

Genera
These 23 genera belong to the subfamily Paramacronychiinae:

 Agria Robineau-Desvoidy, 1830
 Angiometopa Brauer & von Bergenstamm, 1889
 Asiosarcophila Rohdendorf & Verves, 1978
 Blaesoxiphella Villeneuve, 1912
 Brachicoma Rondani, 1856
 Cattasoma Reinhard, 1947
 Chauliooestrus Villeneuve, 1925
 Dexagria Rohdendorf, 1978
 Erythrandra Brauer & von Bergenstamm, 1891
 Galopagomyia Bischof, 1904
 Goniophyto Townsend, 1927
 Kurahashiodes Verves, 2001
 Mimagria Verves, 2001
 Nyctia Robineau-Desvoidy, 1830
 Oophagomyia Rohdendorf, 1928
 Paramacronychia Brauer & von Bergenstamm, 1889
 Primorya Pape, 1998
 Sarcophila Rondani, 1856
 Sarcotachina Portschinsky, 1881
 Toxonagria Shewell, 1987
 Turanomyia Rohdendorf & Verves, 1979
 Wohlfahrtia Brauer & von Bergenstamm, 1889
 Wohlfahrtiodes Villeneuve, 1910

References

Further reading

External links

 

Sarcophagidae
Brachycera subfamilies